Elizabeth "Liz" Harry is Professor of Biology and Director of the ithree institute (infection, immunology and innovation) at the University of Technology, Sydney, Australia (UTS).

Career 
Harry obtained her PhD in Biochemistry from the University of Sydney before attending Harvard University as a National Institutes of Health Postdoctoral Fellow where she pioneered the development of fluorescence microscopy techniques for bacteria that enabled visualisation of the subcellular proteins inside bacterial cells. and revealed that the proteins within bacterial cells have specific cellular addresses.

She then returned to Australia to be an Australian Research Council Postdoctoral then QEII Fellow at the University of Sydney. She then became Associate Professor at the Institute for the Biotechnology of Infectious Diseases at UTS before being promoted to Professor of Biology in 2010.

Achievements 
Harry's research on bacterial cell division has had an significant impact on our understanding of how bacterial cells multiply, and how they control this process to ensure equal partitioning of chromosomes vital for survival. Her research has often changed the direction of thinking in the field, and has afforded excellent opportunities in antibacterial discovery. Her cutting-edge cell biology techniques including super resolution microscopy have provided unique insights in the mechanism and spatiotemporal control of the division process in bacteria. She discovered that the cytokinetic ring, which is a polymer of the tubulin-like protein, FtsZ, forms at the division site at midcell as a result of the remodelling of a cytoskeletal helical assembly of polymers. Her research has shown that this Z ring is linked to the progress of the initiation phase of DNA replication, and gave rise to a new definition for the role of long-known spatial regulators of bacterial division.

More recently Harry has been researching antibacterial discovery and bacterial cell division of bacteria that cause infectious disease, and has worked with industry on the development of novel antibiotics that target this process in pathogens.

Awards 
Harry was awarded the 2002 Australian Eureka Prize for Scientific Research, and the 2008 Frank Fenner Award by the Australian Society for Microbiology in recognition of her contributions to Australian research in microbiology. She has had several plenary invitations to international conferences and served on the executive of the Australian Society for Microbiology for several years. She is currently a member of the Australian Academy of Science, National Committee for Biomedical Sciences.

Selected publications

References

Australian biochemists
Australian microbiologists
Women microbiologists
Australian women chemists
Academic staff of the University of Technology Sydney
University of Sydney alumni
Living people
Year of birth missing (living people)